The Paloș is a right tributary of the river Homorodul Mare in Romania. It flows into the Homorodul Mare in Cața.

References

Rivers of Romania
Rivers of Brașov County
Rivers of Harghita County